The Likoni Ferry is a ferry service across the Kilindini Harbour, serving the Kenyan city of Mombasa between the 
Mombasa island side and the mainland suburb of Likoni.  Two - four double-ended ferries alternate across the harbour, carrying both road and foot traffic. The ferries are operated by the Kenya Ferry Services (KFS), and is the only remaining ferry service by KFS. The Likoni ferry started operating in 1937. Passenger services are free while vehicles, tuktuks, motorcycles and trucks have to pay a ferry toll.

The Mombasa side terminal of the Likoni line is located at the southern end of the Mombasa Island. The distance of the line is about 500 metres.

Service
In addition to the main Likoni line, there is a passenger-only peak hour service between Mtongwe and Mombasa island next to Bandari College. It crosses the Kilindini Creek few kilometres west of the Kilindini line. 
The service was halted pending repairs of the ramp that was damaged. 

  

There are five operating ferries. MV Mvita and MV Pwani were bought in 1969 and 1974, respectively. MV Nyayo, MV Harambee, and MV Kilindini were bought second hand in 1990. KFS is in process to buy two new ferries, but the order was repeatedly delayed. 
The two arrived in June 2010. They have been christened as MV Kwale and MV Likoni.

Three of the operating ferries MV Harambee, MV Nyayo and MV Kilindini have been deregistered from Lloyd's Register (an international maritime classification society), being not seaworthy. As at May 2011, at least MV Nyayo was in use as the relief ferry, and painted blue.

The Dongo Kundu bypass has been planned to ease the congested ferry. The road would run from Shika Adabu (between Likoni and Diani) to Miritini (west of Mombasa Island, along the Mombasa-Nairobi highway). The road would be 12–24 km long depending on whether bridges would be built to cross the Likoni creek. Currently the shortest route by road from Likoni to Mombasa Island is through the Kwale town, 30 kilometres southwest of Mombasa.

A direct bridge or tunnel from Likoni to Mombasa Island had also been proposed, but the high cost of building them has made these options unlikely.

The U.S. Dept of State in its travel advisory on Kenya updated on Feb 27, 2018 has cautioned the use of the Likoni ferry in Mombasa due to safety concerns.

Accidents

Mtongwe Disaster
On April 29, 1994, the MV Mtongwe ferry bound for the mainland capsized just 40 meters from port, killing 272 of the 400 people on board. Following the disaster, it was reported that the capacity of the ship was 300. As of 2005, KFS had compensated 81 families a total of KSh.36,902,472/= (US$486,840).

MV Harambee Faulty Ramp
On September 29, 2019; A mother, 35 year old Mariam Kighenda, and her 4-year-old daughter Amanda Wambua boarded the MV Harambee Ferry, where they lost their lives after their car (Toyota Isis) slipped off the slippery faulty back ramp and plunged into the ocean. As of October 2nd, the rescue team has been using robots in order to locate the victims' bodies trapped in the car. On October 9th, the car and corpses trapped inside were located by South African divers  58 meters deep.
On October 11th 2019, past 4pm Kenyan time, Kenya Navy divers retrieved the car with the corpses inside using a cord and crane. After the retrieval, the vehicle was examined whereby the gear lever was found in Parking mode, the windshield wipers were activated and the decomposed but identifiable bodies of mother and daughter were found dead in a tight embrace in the backseat of the car.
 The deceased family was compensated KSh.200,000/= for the car.

MV Likoni

On the Saturday night of October 12 2019, a portion of MV Likoni's roof that was made of fixed iron sheets was almost blown away by strong winds as it rained heavily, leading to water leaking inside.
On Sunday night, MV Likoni stalled in the middle of Likoni channel with mechanical problems while carrying passengers and vehicles, leading to it drifting under heavy currents. Moments later, MV Jambo came to the rescue by pushing MV Likoni to the shore. Another incident took place on Thursday, October 31st, when the same ferry stalled yet again as a result of a faulty engine, causing panic among the passengers.

Ferrying costs 

Motorbikes pay KSh.50/=, Sedan cars pay KSh.120/=, Mini buses pay KSh.600/= and Buses pay KSh.1,100/=.

Pedestrians and cyclists ride for free.

References

External links 
Kenya Ferry Services

Ferries of Kenya
Mombasa
Maritime incidents in 1994 
Maritime incidents in 2019
1994 in Kenya 
2019 in Kenya 
1994 disasters in Kenya 
2019 disasters in Kenya 
April 1994 events in Africa
Maritime incidents in Kenya